Alexander Viktorovich Kutikov (13 April 1952 in Moscow) is a Soviet/Russian rock musician, composer, producer, and businessman.

Biography
Kutikov was born in a Russian-Jewish family in Patriarshiye Ponds, Moscow. He was an avid fan of groups such as The Beatles during his secondary school years. He later became the bass-guitarist and one of the singers of the Soviet rock band Mashina Vremeni, from 1971 to 1976, and then from to 1979 to present time. Band became famous in the USSR and in Eastern Europe for composing the soundtrack of Dusha (Soul), released in 1981. Kutikov is also the founding president of the sound recording company Sintez Records.

Kutikov wrote the music and performed the vocals for the famous song "Povorot" by Mashina Vremeni.

Awards
Order of Honour
Merited Artist of the Russian Federation
Honorary Prize of RAO and WIPO (2009)

References

External links
 Official site
 Kutikov at Mashina's site
 Bio and discography

1952 births
Living people
Russian rock singers
Soviet male singers
Russian rock guitarists
Male bass guitarists
Russian bass guitarists
Rock bass guitarists
Businesspeople from Moscow
Russian record producers
Recipients of the Order of Honour (Russia)
Honored Artists of the Russian Federation
20th-century bass guitarists
Musicians from Moscow
20th-century Russian male singers
20th-century Russian singers
Russian male guitarists